Makenzy Allyson Doniak (born February 25, 1994) is an American professional soccer player. A forward, she plays for the San Diego Wave of the National Women's Soccer League (NWSL). Spent time on loan at HB Køge in the Elitedivisionen.

Club career

Virginia Cavaliers
Doniak left the  Virginia Cavaliers as the career leader in points (164) and goals (64).

Western New York Flash, 2016
Doniak was drafted by Western New York Flash in the 2nd round of the 2016 NWSL College Draft. Doniak won the 2016 NWSL Championship as a member of the Flash.

North Carolina Courage 2017–2018
Doniak became a member of the Courage when the Western New York Flash were purchased by the North Carolina FC Organization. She was part of the Courage team that won the 2017 NWSL Shield, and advanced to the 2017 Championship Game. Doniak came in as a first half substitute in the final, replacing an injured Taylor Smith. The Courage lost to the Portland Thorns FC 1–0. On February 23, 2018, the Courage announced that Doniak had torn her ACL and would miss the entire 2018 season.

Loan to Adelaide United 2017
On October 27, 2017, Doniak was loaned to Australian club Adelaide United as an international player for the 2017–18 W-League season. She scored 7 goals during the season, which led the team in scoring.

Utah Royals FC, 2018–2019
On June 28, 2018, the Utah Royals acquired Doniak from the Courage in a trade that sent the rights for Heather O'Reilly to North Carolina.

Doniak made her debut for the Royals on May 11, 2019, against the Houston Dash. She scored her first goal for Utah on May 26 in a 2–0 victory over the Orlando Pride. Doniak made one start in 11 appearances for Utah during the 2019 NWSL season.

Chicago Red Stars, 2020–2021
On December 19, 2019, Doniak was traded to the Chicago Red Stars in exchange for Chicago's second round draft pick in the 2021 NWSL College Draft.

San Diego Wave FC, 2021– Present 
In December 2021, the San Diego Wave FC announced it acquired the rights to Doniak, Mexican international Katie Johnson, and Kelsey Turnbow in a trade with the Chicago Red Stars.

References

External links
Virginia bio
 

1994 births
Living people
Adelaide United FC (A-League Women) players
American women's soccer players
National Women's Soccer League players
North Carolina Courage players
People from Chino Hills, California
Soccer players from California
Sportspeople from San Bernardino County, California
United States women's under-20 international soccer players
Virginia Cavaliers women's soccer players
Western New York Flash draft picks
Western New York Flash players
Women's association football forwards
Utah Royals FC players
Chicago Red Stars players
San Diego Wave FC players
American expatriate women's soccer players
American expatriate sportspeople in Australia
Expatriate women's soccer players in Australia
American expatriate sportspeople in Denmark
Expatriate women's footballers in Denmark
HB Køge (women) players